Zar Chi Oo (born 6 May 1988) is a Burmese footballer who plays as a defender for the Myanmar women's national team.

International career
Zar Chi Oo capped for Myanmar at senior level during the 2015 AFF Women's Championship.

References

External links

1988 births
Living people
People from Bago Region
Burmese women's footballers
Women's association football defenders
Myanmar women's international footballers